John Maurice Scott (1948 – 1 July 2001) was the Director General of the Fiji Red Cross and received a Red Cross award for his role in the hostage crisis during the 2000 Fijian coup d'état.

Biography
Scott was born in Suva, Fiji, and educated in Fiji and New Zealand. He held a number of prominent public positions for various national, regional and international councils and programmes. He was a fourth generation European Fijian and his father, Sir Maurice Scott was the first European Speaker in the Parliament of Fiji.

Scott joined the Red Cross in 1994 and played a key mediation role after George Speight seized parliament on 19 May 2000 and took Prime Minister Mahendra Chaudhry and his government hostage for 56 days. Scott was initially the only outsider allowed to see the hostages and eventually oversaw their release. He declined to testify in Speight's trial because he did not want to compromise the neutrality of the Red Cross.

Scott was involved in trying to restore Fiji's overthrown 1997 constitution and was among the members of the gay community that put forward submissions to keep the constitution because it protected LGBT (lesbian, gay, bisexual, transgender) rights.

Scott was murdered on 1 July 2001 in Suva along with his partner, Gregory Scrivener, in an apparent homophobic attack with a possible political motive.

Scott’s story became the subject of a New Zealand documentary, An Island Calling. which is based on the book Deep Beyond The Reef, written by his brother Owen Scott.

References

Further reading

External links
Tribute paid to John Scott, Fiji Red Cross Director General —  International Federation of Red Cross and Red Crescent Societies (2 July 2001)
Tragic death of Fiji Red Cross Director General — Red Cross press release (1 July 2001)
 — documentary about the death of John Scott, including news reel (1 July 2001)

1948 births
2001 deaths
Fijian LGBT people
Red Cross personnel
Gay men
Fijian murder victims
People murdered in Fiji
People educated at Whanganui Collegiate School
People from Suva
Fijian people of British descent
Violence against gay men
2001 murders in Oceania
20th-century LGBT people
2001 crimes in Fiji